Carson is a surname of Scottish and Irish origin.

Notable people with the surname

A
Adam Carson (born 1975), American drummer
Adam Carson (footballer) (??–1935), Scottish footballer
Aglionby Ross Carson (1780–1850), Scottish educationalist
Al Carson (1882–1962), American baseball player
Alex Carson (1923–1981), Canadian football player
Alexander Carson (disambiguation), multiple people
Alfred Carson (1859–1944), Australian journalist
Alyssa Carson (born 2001), American astronaut
André Carson (born 1974), American politician
Anne Carson (born 1950), Canadian poet
Ann Elizabeth Carson (born 1929), Canadian poet
Annette Carson (born 1940), English author
Anthony Carson (disambiguation), multiple people
April Carson, American epidemiologist
Arthur Carson (1895–1985), American missionary

B
Ben Carson (born 1951), American neurosurgeon and politician
Ben Leeds Carson (born 1971), American composer
Big Al Carson (1953–2020), American singer
Bill Carson (disambiguation), multiple people
Brad Carson (born 1967), American lawyer and politician
Brett Carson (born 1985), Canadian ice hockey player
Bruce Carson, Canadian political aide
Bud Carson (1930–2005), American football player and coach

C
Callum Carson (born 1999), Welsh rugby union footballer
Candy Carson (born 1953), American author
Carlos Carson (born 1958), American football player
Carol Carson (born 1945), Canadian politician
Carol S. Carson, American economic statistician
Cathryn Carson (born 1968), American historian
Charles Carson (disambiguation), multiple people
Chris Carson (born 1994), American football player
Ciaran Carson (1948–2019), Northern Irish poet and novelist
Clarice Carson, (1929–2015), Canadian soprano
Clayborne Carson (born 1944), American professor
Clyde Carson (born 1981), American rapper
Crystal Carson (born 1967), American actress
Culley C. Carson III (born 1945), American urologist

D
D. A. Carson (born 1946), Canadian author
Danny Carson (born 1981), English footballer
Darren Carson, New Zealand curler
David Carson (disambiguation), multiple people
Deb Carson, American radio personality
Debi Carson, American artist
Delia E. Wilder Carson (1833–1917), American art educator
Dennis A. Carson, American physician
Dick Carson (born 1929), American television director
Don Carson (born 1946), American theologian
Donald Carson (1929–2000), American pianist

E
Eden Carson (born 2001), New Zealand cricketer
Edris Rice-Wray Carson (1904–1990), American doctor
Edward Carson (1854-1935), Irish unionist politician, barrister and judge
Ella Stuart Carson (1880–??), American screenwriter
Ernest Crawford Carson (1894–1952), Canadian politician
Essence Carson (born 1986), American basketball player

F
Finlay Carson (born 1967), Scottish politician
Frances Carson (1895–1973), American actress
Frank Carson (1926–2012), Irish comedian
Frank Carson (ice hockey) (1902–1957), Canadian ice hockey player

G
Gary Carson (1949–2014), American author
George Carson (disambiguation), multiple people
Gerald Carson (1903–1956), Canadian ice hockey player
Gerald Carson (writer) (1899–1989), American advertising executive
Gilbert Carson (disambiguation), multiple people
Gladys Carson (1903–1987), English swimmer
Glenn Carson (born 1990), American football player
Glenn Carson (Canadian football) (born 1978), Canadian football player

H
Hamish Carson (born 1988), New Zealand runner
Hampton L. Carson (disambiguation), multiple people
Harry Carson (born 1953), American football player
Harry Roberts Carson (1869–1948), American cleric
Henderson H. Carson (1893–1971), American politician
Henry Carson (1866–1948), Australian politician
Howard Carson (disambiguation), multiple people
Hugh A. Carson (??–1913), American politician
Hunter Carson (born 1975), American actor

I
Irving W. Carson (1838–1862), American army captain

J
Jack Carson (disambiguation), multiple people
Jackie Carson (born 1978), American basketball coach
Jahii Carson (born 1993), American basketball player
James Carson (disambiguation), multiple people
Jan Carson, Northern Irish writer
Jean Carson (1923–2005), American actress
Jeannie Carson (born 1928), British comedian
Jim Carson (1912–??), Scottish footballer
Jimmy Carson (born 1968), American ice hockey player
Jeff Carson (1963–2022), American singer
Jenny Lou Carson (1915–1978), American singer-songwriter
Jessie Carson, American librarian
Jo Carson (1946–2011), American playwright
Joan Carson (born 1935), Northern Irish politician
JoAnne Carson (born 1953), American artist
Joe Carson (disambiguation), multiple people
Joel M. Carson III (born 1971), American judge
John Carson (disambiguation), multiple people
Johnnie Carson (born 1943), American diplomat
Johnny Carson (1925–2005), American comedian
Johnny Carson (American football) (1930–2009), American football player
Jon Carson (born 1991), Canadian politician
Joseph Carson (disambiguation), multiple people
Josh Carson (born 1993), Northern Irish footballer
Julia Carson (1938–2007), American politician

K
Ken Carson (disambiguation), multiple people
Kendel Carson (born 1985), Canadian singer
Kern Carson (1941–2002), American football player
Kevin Carson, American political theorist
Kim Carson, American radio personality
Kit Carson (disambiguation), multiple people

L
Lance Carson (1945–2020), American businessman and politician
Lane Carson (born 1947), American real estate broker
Lauren H. Carson (born 1954), American politician
Leonard K. Carson (1923–1994), American fighter pilot
Leonardo Carson (born 1977), American football player
Letitia Carson (1814–1888), American pioneer
Lindsay Carson (born 1960), Canadian ice hockey player
Lisa Nicole Carson (born 1969), American actress
L. M. Kit Carson (1941–2014), American actor
Lori Carson (born 1958), American singer-songwriter

M
Margaret Carson (1911–2007), American publicist
Martha Carson (1921–2004), American singer
Mary Ann Carson, American politician
Matt Carson (born 1975), American author
Michael Carson (disambiguation), multiple people
Mindy Carson (born 1927), American vocalist

N
Neil Carson (born 1973), Irish cricketer
Neil Carson (businessman) (born 1957), British businessman

P
Patricia Carson (1929–2014), Belgian historian
Paul Carson (disambiguation), multiple people
Perry H. Carson (1842–1909), American politician
Peter Carson (1938–2013), English translator
Phil Carson, English record owner
Presley Carson (born 1968), Honduran footballer

R
Rachel Carson (1907–1964), American biologist and author
Rae Carson (born 1973), American writer
Richard Carson (born 1955), American economist
Richard E. Carson, American researcher
Robert Carson (disambiguation), multiple people
Rocky Carson (born 1979), American racquetball player
Russell Carson (born 1943), American businessman

S
Sal Carson (1920–2007), American trumpeter
Sally Carson, Canadian marine biologist
Samuel Carson (disambiguation), multiple people
Sandra Carson, American doctor
Scott Carson (born 1985), English footballer
Scott Patrick Carson, American microbiologist
Sharon Carson (bron 1957), American politician
Silas Carson (born 1965), English actor
Sofia Carson (born 1993), American actress
Sorrel Carson (1920–2005), Irish actress
Stafford Carson (born 1951), Northern Irish minister
Stephen Carson (born 1980), Northern Irish footballer
Stephen Carson (jockey) (born 1979), English jockey
Steve Carson (born 1968), Irish television producer
Stewart Carson (born 1976), South African badminton player
Sunset Carson (1920–1990), American actor

T
Tarik Carson (1946–2014), Uruguayan-Argentine writer and painter
Terrence C. Carson (born 1958), American actor
Thomas Carson (disambiguation), multiple people
Towa Carson (born 1936), Swedish singer
Tra Carson (born 1992), American football player
Trevor Carson (born 1988), Northern Irish footballer

V
Violet Carson (1898–1983), British actress

W
Wallace P. Carson Jr. (born 1934), American attorney
Wayne Carson (1943–2015), American musician
William Carson (disambiguation), multiple people
Willie Carson (disambiguation), multiple people
Witney Carson (born 1993), American dancer

Fictional characters
Cave Carson, a character in DC Comics
Mitchell Carson, a character in the comic series Marvel Comics
Roy Carson, a character from Final Destination 5

See also 
 Carson (disambiguation), a disambiguation page for Carson
 Carson (given name), people with the given name Carson
 Attorney General Carson (disambiguation), a disambiguation page for attorneys general surnamed Carson
 General Carson (disambiguation), a disambiguation page for generals surnamed Carson
 Senator Carson (disambiguation), a disambiguation page for senators surnamed Carson

English-language surnames
Scottish surnames
Surnames of Irish origin